Vivek Prasanna is an Indian actor who appears in Tamil language films, mostly in supporting roles. In 2017, he won the Vijay Award for Best Supporting Actor for his performance in the film Meyaadha Maan.

Career
Vivek Prasanna grew up from a small village Chinanoor (Veeranam) near Salem, India and now settled in Chennai. His brother Karthik Netha is working as a lyricist.

After several appearances in short films and telefilms, he made his acting debut alongside Vijay Sethupathi in Arun Kumar's police drama Sethupathi (2016). A critic from Indiaglitz.com noted that Vivek Prasanna as "the main henchman fits the role to the T".

In 2017, Vivek Prasanna made a breakthrough and appeared in supporting roles in a series of successful Tamil films. His role as the drug lord Ravi in Vikram Vedha and as a politician in Peechankai, also won him acclaim. He then appeared as the second lead in the romantic comedy, Meyaadha Maan, winning rave reviews for his portrayal of the character of Vinoth, eventually earning the Vijay Award for Best Supporting Actor. First, he declined the role of Vinoth in the movie, but director Rathna Kumar convinced him to do the role. Rathna Kumar trusted Vivek Prasanna can be noted on his role for his acting.

Filmography

Film

Television

Web series

References

External links
 
 Vivek Prasanna on Moviebuff

Living people
Male actors in Tamil cinema
21st-century Indian male actors
Tamil comedians
People from Tamil Nadu
Indian male film actors
Indian male comedians
Year of birth missing (living people)